Brian Guiliana in an American college baseball coach and former outfielder. He played college baseball at George Washington University from 1993 to 1996 for head coach Jay Murphy. Guiliana was the head baseball coach at the New Jersey Institute of Technology (NJIT) from 2013 to 2018.

On June 20, 1991, Guiliana committed to play baseball at George Washington. Guiliana served as captain and leading the Colonials in home runs in his senior season. From 2006 through 2010, he served as a scout for the Florida Marlins, covering the New Jersey and the northeast. He worked as the only full-time assistant coach at NJIT in 2011 and 2012, handling recruiting and on field duties, and took over as head coach after the firing of Mike Cole. In all of his seasons, he has led the Highlanders to 20 wins or more. On August 23, 2018, Guiliana stepped down as the head coach at NJIT.

Head coaching record

References

External links
Brian Guiliana Steps Down as Head Baseball Coach NJIT Highlanders

Living people
George Washington Colonials baseball players
Miami Marlins scouts
NJIT Highlanders baseball coaches
Year of birth missing (living people)